Aeolocoelotes is a genus of east Asian funnel weavers. It was first described by K. Okumura in 2020, and it has only been found in Japan.

Species
 it contains eight species:
A. bifurcatus (Okumura & Ono, 2006) – Japan
A. cornutus (Nishikawa, 2009) – Japan
A. mohrii (Nishikawa, 2009) – Japan
A. personatus (Nishikawa, 1973) – Japan
A. saikaiensis (Okumura, 2013) – Japan
A. sanoi (Nishikawa, 2009) – Japan
A. unicatus (Yaginuma, 1977) – Japan
A. unzenensis (Okumura, 2013) – Japan

See also
 List of Agelenidae species

References

Further reading

Agelenidae genera
Arthropods of Japan